Mark Twain School, also known as the Poplar Bluff Museum, is a historic school building located at Poplar Bluff, Butler County, Missouri. It was built in 1910, and is a two-story, "H"-plan, Classical Revival style brick building. The building consists of two, parallel, rectangular-plan, hipped roof blocks joined by an enclosed two-story flat roof corridor.  It remained in use as an elementary school until 1988.

It was listed on the National Register of Historic Places in 1998.

References

External links
Poplar Bluff History Museum

History museums in Missouri
School buildings on the National Register of Historic Places in Missouri
Neoclassical architecture in Missouri
School buildings completed in 1910
Buildings and structures in Butler County, Missouri
National Register of Historic Places in Butler County, Missouri